Mount Parnassus is a mountain in Greece, sacred in mythology and a metaphor for the arts and learning.

Parnassus or Parnassos may also refer to:

Geography

Greece and Rome
 Parnassos (municipality), a former municipality in Phocis, Greece, named for Mount Parnassus
 Parnassus (Cappadocia), an ancient Roman town in Asia Minor, a former Catholic diocese and present titular see

New Zealand
 Parnassus, New Zealand, a town on the South Island

United States
 Mount Parnassus (Colorado), a summit in the Rocky Mountains
 Mount Sutro, formerly Mount Parnassus, a hill in San Francisco, California
 Parnassus, Pennsylvania, a neighborhood of New Kensington, Pennsylvania

Humanities

Literature and mythology
 Parnassos, in myth, the son of the nymph Cleodora, and namesake of the mountain
 Parnassus plays, a comedic cycle originally performed at Cambridge University 1598–1602
 Parnassos, a Greek literary magazine published by the Parnassos Literary Society in Athens, 1877–1895
 Parnassus (literary magazine), the literary arts magazine of Northern Essex Community College, Massachusetts, founded in 1965
 Parnassus (magazine), an American literary magazine published in New York, 1973–2019

Painting and sculpture
 Parnassus (Mantegna), a 1497 painting by Andrea Mantegna
 Parnassus (Poussin), a 1631–1633 painting by Nicolas Poussin
 The Parnassus, a 1511 painting by Raphael
 Frieze of Parnassus, an 1860s frieze on the Albert Memorial, London, England

Other
  – one of several vessels by that name
 Parnassos Strovolou, a Cypriot sports club in Strovolos

See also 
 Montparnasse, a neighbourhood in Paris
 Parnassia, a plant genus
 Parnassius, a butterfly genus 
 Parnassianism, a 19th-century French literary movement
 The Imaginarium of Doctor Parnassus, a 2009 fantasy film